Akbar Poudeh (13 March 1932 – 23 June 2012) was an Iranian cyclist. He competed in the individual road race and team time trial events at the 1964 Summer Olympics.

References

External links
 

1932 births
2012 deaths
Iranian male cyclists
Olympic cyclists of Iran
Cyclists at the 1964 Summer Olympics
Place of birth missing
20th-century Iranian people